The Karabaglyar Formation is a geologic formation in Armenia and Azerbaijan. It preserves fossils dated to the Changhsingian age of the Permian period and the Induan age of the Triassic period, straddling the Permian-Triassic boundary.

Fossil content 
The following fossils have been reported from the formation:

Ammonites

 Eumorphotis venetiana
 Meekophiceras dubium
 Ophiceras (Lytophiceras) medium
 Eumorphotis sp.
 Gyronites sp.
 Koninckites sp.
 Kymatites sp.
 Lytophiceras sp.
 Ophiceras sp.

Bivalves

 Claraia aurita
 Claraia clarai
 Claraia stachei
 Claraia wangi
 Claraia sp.

See also 

 List of fossiliferous stratigraphic units in Armenia
 List of fossiliferous stratigraphic units in Azerbaijan
 Gnishik Formation
 Permian–Triassic extinction event

References

Bibliography 
 

Geologic formations of Armenia
Geologic formations of Azerbaijan
Permian System of Asia
Permian Armenia
Permian Azerbaijan
Triassic System of Asia
Triassic Armenia
Triassic Azerbaijan
Changhsingian
Induan Stage
Limestone formations
Shale formations
Open marine deposits
Permian southern paleotropical deposits
Paleontology in Armenia
Paleontology in Azerbaijan